Hoàng Gia Hợp  (1907 – 7 February 2009) was a prominent Vietnamese-French medical doctor. He was a pioneering medical professional in Vietnam from the 1930s until his retirement in the 1990s.

Education
He completed the French Baccalaureate II Diploma ranking Excellent, from Paris, France.
He graduated from the French established medical school in Hanoi Medical University – First Class of Medical School.

Family
Hoàng is a direct descendant and oldest son of Dr. Hoàng Gia Hội, 1st class of Medicin established by the French Government in Hà Nội; an aristocrat family. He was married to Khương Hữu Thị Võ – a wealthy and well-established family Khương Hữuh in ViệtNam, France, and the United States. Hoàng is brother-in-law of South ViệtNam High Ranking Navy "Flag Officer" Khuong Huu Ba that held positions of Superintendent of the South Vietnamese Naval Academy and Fourth Coastal Zone Naval Commander & Army Regiment Military Special Zone Commander. They have one daughter Hoàng Thu Thủy (married to Doctor Tạ Minh Hiển – Canada)

Medical practice and political life 
After graduating from medical school, he worked for a French hospital for three years. Subsequently, he found and established a private hospital in Hà Nội. Upon the division of North and South ViệtNam, Hoàng immigrated to the South. His medical practice was well known throughout the country, he assumed the position of Deputy Minister of Department of Health for the First Republic of South ViệtNam (trong thời đại nầy miền Nam ViệtNam không có chức vụ Thứ Trưởng – Đổng Lý Văn Phòng cũa Bộ là Thứ Trưởng).

Founder and CEO of Hùng Vương Hospital I SàiGòn 
After cabinet member-level position, Dr. Hoàng served as chief inspector for the Department of Health for years. During this time, Hoàng inspected, coached, and provided guiding directions to many hospitals across South ViệtNam. In this inspection role, Hoàng saw the necessity of helping the Vietnamese people to have better access to medical care. On his own and with his own savings, he founded and established Hùng Vương Hospital  which later became South ViêtNam one of the most prestigious hospitals. He continued to seek for private donation and American aids during the ViệtNam conflict to better equip the hospital with all modern medical technologies as well as training Hospital staff. Hoàng was one of key instrumental in managing, teaching, and judging many Medical Students Graduating Doctorate Theses. His signature was in many hundreds of Medical Doctor degrees from South VietNam only National Medical/Dental school in SàiGòn, ViệtNam.

Life in retirement
After two decades of internal civil war, Vietnam was united between North and South, Hoàng immigrated to Canada with his wife Hoàng Khương Hữu Thị Võ. He died on 7 February 2009 at the age of 102 years.

Quotes
 "Medical Profession is to serve and help the poor, the illness, and the unfortunate ones"

Books

See also
 List of hospitals in Vietnam
 Hanoi Medical University – French Established Medical School in Hà Nội – Việt Nam

References

External links
 Personal history 

1907 births
2009 deaths
Vietnamese people of the Vietnam War
Vietnamese Buddhists
People from Hanoi
Vietnamese centenarians
Men centenarians